Hunter Snevily (1956–2013) was an American mathematician with expertise and contributions in Set theory, Graph theory, Discrete geometry, and Ramsey theory on the integers.

Education and career 
Hunter received his undergraduate degree from Emory University in 1981, and his Ph.D. degree from the University of Illinois Urbana-Champaign under the supervision of Douglas West (mathematician) in 1991. After a postdoctoral fellowship at Caltech, where he mentored many students, Hunter took a faculty position at the University of Idaho in 1993 where he was a professor until 2010. He retired early  while fighting with Parkinsons, but continued research in mathematics till his last days.

Mathematics research
The following are some of Hunter's most important contributions:
 Hunter formulated a conjecture (1991)  bounding the size of a family of sets under intersection constraints. His conjecture was ambitious in a way it would beautifully unify classical results of Nicolaas Govert de Bruijn and Paul Erdős (1948), Bose (1949), Majumdar (1953), H. J. Ryser (1968), Frankl and Füredi (1981), and Frankl and Wilson (1981). Hunter finally proved his conjecture in 2003
 Hunter made important contribution to the well known Chvátal's Conjecture (1974) which states that every hereditary family  of sets has a largest intersecting subfamily consisting of sets with a common element. Schönheim proved this when the maximal members of  have a common element. Hunter's 1992 result greatly strengthened both Schönheim's result and Chvátal's result by proving the conjecture for all families having a dominant element; it was major progress on the problem. 
 One of his most cited papers is with Lior Pachter and Bill Voxman  on Graph pebbling. This paper and Hunter's later paper with Foster added several conjectures on the subject and together have been cited in more than 50 papers.
 Hunter made important contributionson the Snake-in-the-box problem and on the Graceful labeling of graphs.
Noga Alon proved this for cyclic groups of prime order. Dasgupta et al. (2001). proved it for all cyclic groups. Finally, after a decade, the conjecture was proved for all groups by a young mathematician Arsovski. Terence Tao devoted a section to Snevily's Conjecture in his well-known book Additive Combinatorics.
 Hunter collaborated the most with his long-term friend André Kézdy. After retirement, he became friends with Tanbir Ahmed and explored experimental mathematics that resulted in several publications

References

American mathematicians

1956 births
2013 deaths